Bhagat Ki Kothi–Sabarmati Intercity-Express is an Intercity Express train belonging to Western Railway zone that runs between  and  in India. It is currently being operated with 14819/14820 train numbers on a daily basis.

Service

14819/Bhagat Ki Kothi–Sabarmati Intercity-Express has an average speed of 51 km/hr and covers 454 km in 9h 05m
14820/Sabarmati–Bhagat Ki Kothi Intercity-Express has an average speed of 46 km/hr and covers 454 km in 9h 50m.

Schedule

Route

Coach composition

The train has dedicated LHB rakes and PM of rakes is done . The train consists of 16 coaches:

 1 Second A/C
 2 A/C Chair Chair
 3 Second Chair Car
 9 General Unreserved
 2 End on Generator

Traction

Both trains are hauled by an Abu Road Loco Shed diesel WDM-3A locomotive from Sabarmati to Bhagat Ki Kothi and vice versa.

See also 

 Bhagat Ki Kothi railway station
 Sabarmati railway station
 Bhagat Ki Kothi–Ahmedabad Weekly Express

References 

Transport in Ahmedabad
Intercity Express (Indian Railways) trains
Rail transport in Gujarat
Transport in Jodhpur
Rail transport in Rajasthan